The name Haitang has been used to name four tropical cyclones in the northwestern Pacific Ocean. The name was contributed by China and literally means "Chinese flowering crabapple".

 Typhoon Haitang (2005) (T0505, 05W, Feria) – struck Taiwan and China.
 Tropical Storm Haitang (2011) (T1118, 21W) – made landfall in Vietnam.
 Tropical Storm Haitang (2017) (T1710, 12W, Huaning) – struck Taiwan and China.
 Tropical Storm Haitang (2022) (T2221, 24W) —  churned in the open ocean and affected no land areas.

Pacific typhoon set index articles